Brazilian  Abolitionist Movement for Animal liberation is social movement against the exploitation of nonhuman animals, this theoretical and practical approach differ from animal welfare which seeks to regulate this exploitation to make it more humane.

Animal abolitionist
Tagore Trajano was elected Animal Abolitionist Institute's president in 2010. For him, "the animal rights movement has helped to develop ambitious theories and challenge the Brazilian system. New authors have chosen this area to study and develop their research. This modest beginning has been helpful in furthering future debate. In the judiciary branch, the struggle has just begun". .

According to Heron Santana, former president of the Animal Abolitionist Institute it is wrong of those who oppose animal abolitionism to imagine that this movement is against humanity. In fact, it refers to the extension of the moral sphere to include animals rather than threatening man exalting him. If we understand cruelty as the act of doing something bad, tormenting or damaging others through insensitive, inhumane, painful acts, all and any cruel practice to animals therefore offends rather than confirms the principle of human dignity.

The social inefficacy of the principles and rules of article 225 of the Federal Constitution of Brazil occur because of the social obstacles that Lassalle called real factors of power, such as the animal's exploration industry and the psychological blocks putted by the speciesism's ideology, that has soldier, until the moment, that the legal factors transform into real factors of power.

However it may be, it will be always possible to demand of the Third Power the compatibility of the inferior norms with the constitutional rules, because the real factors of the power come passing for significant changes, as the current environmental crisis and the recent scientific discovered have demonstrated.

The environmental crisis and factors as the global warming, the water pollution by the animal's exploration industry, the increase of the illnesses because of the meat consumption associates to the abolitionism and vegetarian movements amplify around the world are an evidence that the real factors are modifying.

A sign of progress of the issue in Brazil is the creation of the Animal Abolitionism Institute, occurred during the 1st Brazilian and Latin American Vegetarian Congress at Latin America Memorial. It's an institute that comes to addict to Brazilian Vegetarian Society in its efforts to abolish the animal slavery. Furthermore, it will help everybody that doesn't have legal support and philosophy's fundament in the elaboration of a process to defend the animal's interests.

The importance of this institute, the first in Brazil, is pragmatic and, probably, we will still hear to talk about it so much. It's important to say that it has between his creators some of the biggest thinkers and exponents of this power in Brazil as Sônia Teresinha Felipe, Laerte Levai, Marly Winckler, Irvênia Prada, Edna Cardozo Dias, Luciano Rocha Santana and others.

The institute launched the Brazilian Animal Law Journal, the pioneer journal in Latin American. The coordinators are Heron Gordilho, Luciano Santana and Tagore Trajano

Even Peter Singer, that faithful to Jeremy's Bentham positivism, refused to talk about animal rights, currently defends the extension of the human rights for the great primates, under the argument that we already have enough evidences that they are part of our sort.

As the Swiss vs Director of Biodiversity, Environmental and Hydrological Resource Department case has demonstrated, this can occur, as with slavery, without a constitutional amendment, therefore when article 225, §1º, VII of the Federal Constitution of Brazil ruled that the government and society must protect all animals, forbidden, in form of the law, practises that put in risk their ecological function, increase the extinction of species or submit them into cruel practises. Therefore, this norm must have an immediate effect.

See also
Argument from Marginal Cases
Utilitarian Bioethics
Utilitarianism

References

External links
 Law, Animals, and Professors
 Animal Legal and Historical Center
 Animal Legal Defense Fund
 Animal Law Review
 International Institute for Animal Law
 Journal of Animal Law and Ethics

Animal welfare organisations based in Brazil
Animal rights organizations